Various methods of academic grading in New Zealand are shown below.

Secondary schools

NCEA
The National Certificate of Educational Achievement, the current national secondary school qualifications, uses standard-based assessment. Assessment for Achievement Standards uses a four-grade system, the lowest being a failing grade, while Unit Standards use a simple achieved/not achieved (pass/fail) grade system.

Several schools in New Zealand, predominantly in Auckland, also offer the CIE (Cambridge International Examinations) Program and IB (International Baccalaureate)  in addition to NCEA.

Additional grades include

W = Withdrawn - Student was enrolled in the class/subject but withdrew before the examination or assessment could be awarded.
N/A Aegrotat = When a student is off school from extreme circumstances (Life-threatening illness, coma, quarantine from an epidemic, extreme family situation (Refugeeism, force majeure, takeover or war in home country), an aegrotat pass may be awarded based on what the student may have earned as a grade, based on coursework so far and/or previous years results in each subject. This is an extreme situation and granted on a case-by-case basis.

P = Progressing - a Fail grade awarded to students through the year, when they are not achieving but are showing progress and are attempting the work, the goal is to get them to Achieved. It is not awarded as an official end of year grade and the student will either get a N or an A.

A+ = High Achievement -  Another unofficial grade given in internal school assessments at some schools, this is to suggest a student who is working at a high level of achievement, but not high enough for Merit. Usually as the gulf between Achieved and Merit is so wide, some 50% of students get Achieved yet less than 25% get a Merit or Excellence.

School Certificate
Until 2002, School Certificate, the predecessor to NCEA Level 1, used a norm-based five-grade system.

Universities
New Zealand universities generally award letter grades (i.e. A to D) to students, with +/- variations. These letter grades correspond to percentage mark bands, though these vary between universities (common cut-offs for A+ include 90% and 85%, and even within a university, an A+ from one department may vary from an A+ from another, with the actual cut-off subject to discretion). D grade is a failing grade, corresponding to work receiving less than 50%. However, for Honours degrees, the letter grades also correspond to degree classes, with A+/A/A- grades corresponding to a first, B+/high B corresponding to 2:1, etc.

Most universities in New Zealand mark C− as the minimum passing grade; these include but are not exclusive to University of Waikato.

See also 
 Grade (education)
 National Certificate of Educational Achievement

References

External links 
 NCEA at the New Zealand Ministry of Education

New Zealand
Education in New Zealand
Grading